Erich Klausener (25 January 1885 – 30 June 1934) was a German Catholic politician and Catholic martyr in the "Night of the Long Knives", a purge that took place in Nazi Germany from 30 June to 2 July 1934, when the Nazi regime carried out a series of political murders.

Family 
Klausener was born in Düsseldorf to a Catholic family. His father, Peter Klausener (1844-1904), was a member of the Austrian Flirsch Klausener family, who came to the Rhineland in 1740, and are relatives of the Cluysenaar family. His father studied law and served as an assessor and justice of the peace in Malmedy, Prussia. His mother, Elisabeth Bisenbach (1864-1944), was from an upper-class family in Düsseldorf. Klausener followed his father's career in public service, serving for a time in the Prussian Ministry of Commerce. He served as an artillery officer in Belgium, France and on the eastern front of World War I, and was awarded the Iron Cross Second Class in 1914 and the Iron Cross First Class in 1917. Klausener's participation in a boycott during the French occupancy of Ruhr in 1923 and 1924, however, earned him a sentence of two months in prison.

Career 
From 1924, Klausener served in Prussia in the Ministry of Welfare, and later headed the police division Ministry of Interior of that state. From 1928, Klausener became head of the group Catholic Action. Before 1933, he strongly supported the police battle against illegal Nazi activities. After Adolf Hitler and Nazis came to power in 1933, Hermann Göring became minister-president of Prussia. Klausener was displaced from the ministry of transport of Prussia when Göring started to Nazify the Prussian police, and Klausener was transferred to the Reich Ministry of Transportation.

Chair of Catholic Action Berlin 
In 1928, Klausener joined the Katholischen Akademikerverbandes (Catholic Academic Association) and was elected to its board. (Another sources states that Klausener "initiated" Catholic Action in Berlin in 1922 via encyclical Ubi Arcano)

Assassination 
A close associate of Vice Chancellor Franz von Papen, Klausener contributed to his Marburg speech delivered on 17 June 1934. The speech was largely written by Edgar Jung, but the contributions of Klausener and Secretary Herbert von Bose cost them their lives. The speech, though moderate in tone, criticized the violence and repression that had followed since Hitler became Chancellor. It called for an end to the revolution, Nazi terror and for the restoration of normalcy, freedom, and freedom of the press.

On 24 June 1934, Klausener spoke at the Catholic Congress in the Berlin's Hoppegarten. His passionate criticism of the repression was viewed by the Nazis as an open challenge.

Six days later, on 30 June 1934, during the "Night of the Long Knives", SS officer Kurt Gildisch was ordered by Reinhard Heydrich to go to Klausener's office at the Ministry of Transport to assassinate him. After the killing, Gildisch was promoted in rank to SS-Sturmbannführer.

Martyr 

After the end of the Nazi regime and after World War II, a monument was erected to Klausener in Berlin. In 1963, his ashes were buried in a grave in the Catholic Church Maria Regina Martyrum, in commemoration of the martyrs of the Nazi era. In 1999, the Catholic Church in Germany accepted Klausener into the German martyrology as a witness of faith.

Legacy

Tributes and memorials 
 Erich-Klausener-Gymnasium (State High-School) in Adenau is named after him
Klausener had seven Straßen (streets) named after him:
 Erich-Klausener-Straße, Düsseldorf
 Erich-Klausener-Straße, Neuss
 Erich-Klausener-Straße, Krefeld
 Erich-Klausener-Straße, Monheim am Rhein 
 Erich-Klausener-Straße, Ludwigsfelde
 Erich-Klausener-Straße, Brieselang
 Erich-Klausener-Straße, Blankenfelde-Mahlow
Leo-Statz-Platz in Unterbilk, Düsseldorf

 Memorial stone
 Stolperstein

Gallery

See also 
 Herbert von Bose
 Edgar Julius Jung
 Franz von Papen

References

External links 
 Brief biography of Erich Klausener – from the German Resistance Memorial Center
 
 

1885 births
1934 deaths
Politicians from Düsseldorf
Erich
People from the Rhine Province
German Roman Catholics
Executed German Resistance members
Victims of the Night of the Long Knives
Recipients of the Iron Cross (1914), 1st class
20th-century Roman Catholic martyrs
20th-century venerated Christians
People from North Rhine-Westphalia executed by Nazi Germany
People executed by Germany by firearm
Prussian Army personnel
Roman Catholics in the German Resistance
German Army personnel of World War I